The Mariner East pipelines are a series of Natural Gas Liquids pipelines under construction in the US state of Pennsylvania. The pipelines are intended to facilitate the transfer of Natural Gas Liquids from the Utica Shale and Marcellus Shale Formations to ports on the eastern seaboard where the ethane, butane, pentane, propane mix will be shipped to Scotland for plastics production. The construction of the pipelines generated considerable controversy inside Pennsylvania. Construction on the pipelines, dubbed Mariner East 1, 2 , and 2X, is being undertaken by Sunoco Pipeline.

Pipelines

Mariner East 1 
Mariner East 1 was originally built as a gasoline pipeline in the 1930s. The conversion of the gasoline pipeline into a NGL compatible pipeline was completed in 2015. In March 2018 portions of the pipeline were temporarily shut down by the State of Pennsylvania after the pipeline was suspected of causing sinkholes in West Whiteland Township.

Mariner East 2 
Mariner East 2 is a new pipeline under construction in Pennsylvania that is intended to supplement Mariner East 1's ability to move natural gas liquids from Western Pennsylvania to a refinery in Marcus Hook, Delaware County. Combined with Mariner East 1, the 16-inch pipeline will carry 345,000 barrels of natural gas liquids per day.

Construction 
The Mariner East 2 pipeline was constructed using horizontal directional drilling, a process which has been noted for its relatively minimal impact on surface topsoil. However Sunoco has been issued over 12.6 Million dollars in fines from the PA Dept. of Environmental Protection, who has twice halted completion of the project in less than a year for violations.  In March 2018 the Pennsylvania Public Utility Commission halted construction when the experimental horizontal directional drilling ruptured a fault line and created sinkholes in a suburban neighborhood.

Outright construction on Mariner East 2 began in February 2017 at a projected cost of $2.5 billion, though a number of delays extended the construction timetable by 18 months. Said delays included issues with permitting, extensive litigation with landowners on whose land the pipeline traverses, opposition from environmental groups, and instances of accidental pollution. Construction was halted between the beginning of January and early February 2018 after horizontal drilling resulted in the pollution of well water. A $12.6 million dollar civil penalty was also issued to Sunoco by the State of Pennsylvania.

In early April 2018 machines being used to construct the pipeline were vandalized at a construction site in West Whiteland Township. Both Sunoco and an environmentalist group blamed each other for the sabotage, and both offered a $10,000 reward for information about the vandalism. In mid April 2018 Sunoco announced that it would consider switching from using horizontal direction drilling to more traditional bore hole drilling at construction sites in West Whiteland Township. This decision came in the wake of concerns about HDD drilling affecting local aquifers and wells. Local residents and legislators are vehemently opposed to the switch in drilling method as this would have the highly volatile gases 4 feet from surface through questionable and unstable geology in densely populated areas.

Initially planned to be completed in 2018, planned completion was pushed back to 2019 and then into 2020. As of February 2022, the project is complete.

Mariner East 2X 
Mariner East 2X is a 20-inch pipeline envisioned to run parallel to the Mariner East 2 pipeline. The projected capacity of the 2X is 250,000 barrels of NGL per day. Initially planned to be completed in 2019, it wasn't until February 2022 that the pipeline was completed.

References 

Natural gas pipelines in the United States
Natural gas pipelines in Pennsylvania